During the 1999–2000 season, Middlesbrough participated in the FA Premier League.

Season summary
Middlesbrough experienced another satisfactory season, finishing 12th in the Premiership. They never looked like qualifying for Europe, but were never in any danger of relegation. Nor did they make much of an impact in the cup competitions.

Kit
Middlesbrough's kit was produced by Errea. The home shirt consisted of a red shirt with vertical navy and white stripes (repeated diagonally on the arms), white shorts with red stripes and red socks with navy and white trim. The away strip consisted of a white shirt with purple hoop framed with a black line, purple collar and shoulder bars, again with black trim, white shorts trimmed with purple and black and white purple topped socks.

Middlesbrough were again sponsored by BT Cellnet.

Final league table

Results summary

Results by round

Results
Middlesbrough's score comes firstc

Legend

FA Premier League

FA Cup

League Cup

Squad

Left club during season

Reserve squad

Transfers

In

Out

Transfers in:  £6,500,000
Transfers out:  £50,000
Total spending:  £6,450,000

Player statistics

Goalscorers
Goalscoring statistics for 1999–2000.

Notes

References

Middlesbrough F.C. seasons
Middlesbrough